Mirza Nasir-ud-Din Muḥammad Shah (Persian: میرزا ناصر الدین محمد شاه) (born Roshan Akhtar; 7 August 1702 – 26 April 1748) was the 13th Mughal emperor, who reigned from 1719 to 1748. He was son of Khujista Akhtar, the fourth son of Bahadur Shah I. After being chosen by the Sayyid Brothers of Barha, he ascended the throne at the young age of 16, under their strict supervision. He later got rid of them with the help of Asaf Jah I – Syed Hussain Ali Khan was murdered at Fatehpur Sikri in 1720 and Syed Hassan Ali Khan Barha was fatally poisoned in 1722. Muhammad Shah was a great patron of the arts, including musical, cultural and administrative developments.  His pen-name was Sadā Rangīla (Ever Joyous) and he is often referred to as "Muhammad Shah Rangila", also sometimes as "Bahadur Shah Rangila" after his grand father Bahadur Shah I.

Although he was a patron of the arts, Muhammad Shah's reign was marked by rapid and irreversible decline of the Mughal Empire. The Mughal Empire was already decaying, but the invasion by Nader Shah of Persia and the subsequent sacking of Delhi, the Mughal capital, greatly accelerated the pace. The course of events not only shocked and mortified the Mughals themselves, but also other foreigners, including the British.

Reign
On 29 September 1719, Muhammad Shah was given the title Abu Al-Fatah Nasir-ud-Din Roshan Akhtar Muhammad Shah and enthroned in the Red Fort. His mother was given an allowance of 15 thousand rupees monthly for her needs, but the Sayyid Brothers kept the new emperor under strict supervision.

The Mughal Grand Vizier Syed Hassan Ali Khan Barha and his brother the Mughal commander and chief Syed Hussain Ali Khan Barha were well aware that Asaf Jah I and his companions  Zain ud-din Ahmad Khan intended to dissolve their administration. The Sayyid Brothers quickly nominated an amateur, Prince Muhammad Ibrahim, who proclaimed himself Mughal Emperor, but he was quickly defeated by the new loyalists of the young Muhammad Shah on 13 November 1720.

On 9 October 1720, Syed Hussain Ali Khan Barha, the commander and chief of the most elite Mughal Army, was assassinated in his encampment in Toba Bhim. The Mughal Emperor Muhammad Shah took direct command of his forces. Asaf Jah I was then dispatched to gain complete control of six Mughal provinces in the Deccan, and Muhammad Amin Khan Turani was assigned as the Mansabdar of 8,000. He was sent to pursue the Mughal Grand Vizier Syed Hassan Ali Khan Barha, who was defeated at the Battle of Hasanpur by Muhammad Amin Turani, Khan-i Dauran, Sher Afkan Panipati, and Amin-ud-Din Sambhali. Hassan Khan Barha fought on the side opposing Khan-i-Dauran where the most danger was anticipated. He was captured by Muhammad Shah on 15 November 1720 and executed two years later. Previously the emperor had to fight Muhammad Ibrahim, but young Muhammad Shah defeated him on 13 November 1720. The fall of the Sayyid Brothers marked the beginning of the end of the Mughal Empire's direct control over its dominions in the Deccan.

In the year 1721, young Muhammad Shah married the daughter of the previously deposed Mughal Emperor Farrukhsiyar.

On 21 February 1722, Muhammad Shah appointed the Asaf Jah I as Grand Vizier. He advised Muhammad Shah to be "as cautious as Akbar and as brave as Aurangzeb". The youthful emperor expected Asaf Jah I to act as an elderly statesman and faithful servant of the emperor, but the cunning Asaf Jah proved to be more self-willed, and attempted to use his influence with the emperor to increase his territorial ambitions in the Deccan. With the pretext of restoring law and order in Gujarat, he sent there an expedition and appointed his maternal uncle, the relative of Saadullah Khan named Hamid Khan, to administer Gujarat. Thus he failed to win the confidence of the Emperor and lost in the estimation of the nobles. Muhammad Shah was young and foolish, and allowed his favorites to make remarks about him, when he wore his Deccan clothing to court, such as: "See how the Deccan monkey dances!". His efforts were misrepresented and thwarted by the nobles close to the Emperor. When Asaf Jah I realized that he was not liked by the emperor, he decided to return to the Deccan. Asaf Jah I resigned his post as the Grand Vizier when Muhammad Shah expressed negligence towards his administration, and left the imperial court in disgust.  Asaf Jah I appointed commander Ewaz Khan as the master of the garrison at Aurangabad, and much of his logistical duties were carried out by Inayatullah Kashmiri. In 1723 he set out on an expedition to the Deccan, where he fought Mubariz Khan, the Mughal Subedar of the Deccan, who kept the ravaging Marathas at bay. Mubariz Khan was a former ally of the Barha Sayyids, who was appointed by Muhammad Shah to kill Asaf Jah I. Taking advantage of Mubariz Khan's conventional weaknesses, Asaf Jah I defeated and eliminated his opponent during the Battle of Shakar Kheda. Asaf Jah I then established the Nizam of Hyderabad in 1725.

The ears of the Emperor were possessed by the Amir-ul-Umara, Khan-i Dauran. Muhammad Shah appointed Qamar-ud-Din Khan as Wazir in succession to the Nizam. However he was shortly dismissed in favour of Roshan-ud-Daulah Turrah Baz Khan, a native of Panipat, who was appointed the Wazir, in order to reduce the influence of the Turani family. 

During this time, the Mughal-Maratha Wars (1728–1763) would cause irreparable devastation to the inhabitants of the ill-administered Mughal Empire. As the Mughal court of Northern India was hostile to Nizam-ul-Mulk and attempted to suppress his independence, the Nizam encouraged the Marathas to invade Malwa and the northern Indian territories of the empire in order to save himself from intentions of the Emperor. The Nizam, who considered the Maratha army as his own, says that he used the Marathas to his own advantage in the Maasir-i Nizami: 
"I consider all this army (Marathas) as my own and I will get my work done through them. It is necessary to take our hands off Malwa. God willing, I will enter into an understanding with them and entrust the Mulukgiri(raiding) on that side of the Narmada to them."
Despite efforts to counter the rise of rebellions in 1724, by the Nawab of Awadh Saadat Ali Khan and the Mughal Subedar in Bangalore, Dilawar Khan (r.1726–1756), who established a well-protected bastion in the Malabar Coast. Muhammad Ali Khan the Mughal Faujdar of Rangpur and his stern ally Deena Narayan were ambushed out of Koch Bihar by Upendra Narayan a Hindu Bihari and Mipham Wangpo (r.1729–1736) the ruler of Bhutan. Ali Mohammed Khan had established the barons of Rohilakhand. The Nawab of Bhopal, Yar Muhammad Khan Bahadur, also ratified by the Mughal Emperor Muhammad Shah in 1728, countered ceaseless raids by the Marathas in Malwa and nearly began to lose half of his territories in the year 1742.

Muhammad Shah eventually learned the skills of statesmanship after removing his three incompetent advisors, namely Koki Jee (his foster sister), Roshan-ud-Daula (his mercantile friend) and Sufi Abdul Ghafur of Thatta (his spiritual teacher).

In the Punjab region, the Sikhs were at war with Mughal Subedars, and the hit-and-run tactics of the Sikh warriors caused devastation. In Ajmer, Ajit Singh carved out a vast territory and allied himself with the renegade Marathas. While in the Deccan the Marathas had ruined Mughal fortifications and were already on the warpath. All this greatly contributed to the decline of the Mughal Empire.

In 1737, the Marathas under Baji Rao I annexed Gujarat, Malwa and Bundelkhand, and raided the Mughal capital Delhi.

In 1739, Nader Shah of Persia, lured by the wealth and weakness of the Mughals, took advantage of a rebellion on his eastern borders near Kandahar and initiated a campaign against the Mughal Empire capturing Ghazni, Kabul, Lahore, and Sindh. He then advanced against Muhammad Shah and defeated him at the Battle of Karnal. Rao Bal Kishan, with his army and with the forces of Delhi, fought Nadir Shah. His army included 5000 infantry and 2000 cavalry. Rao Bal Kishan was killed in the battle but immortalized the name "Vijay or Veergati" The Battle was ambitious as Nadir Shah itself remarked to Mughal Emperor that if your combined forces helped Rao Balkrishna of Rewari, than I might not able to enter in Delhi. I had never seen any warrior like him brave , Fierce and  strong. After this to a royal chhatri kiosk was made by Mughal Emperor to remark tribute to Rao Balkrishna. Today also the Chhatri is in Karnal.   

In 1748, Ahmad Shah Durrani of Afghanistan invaded the Mughal Empire. Heir apparent Ahmad Shah Bahadur, Grand Vizier Qamaruddin Khan and his son Moin-ul-Mulk better known as Mir Mannu, Intizam-ud-Daula and Safdarjung were sent with 75,000 men after the defeat of Shahnawaz Khan in Lahore. At the Battle of Manupur (1748), Durrani's 12,000 men were defeated, and he was forced to retreat. There was a great rejoicing for this event throughout the Mughal Empire.

Cultural developments

While Urdu (derived from Zuban-i Urdū-yi Muʿallá or in local translation Lashkari Zaban, shortened to Lashkari) was already in use before Muhammad Shah's reign, it was during his reign that it became more popular among the people and he declared it as the court language, replacing Persian. During Muhammad Shah's reign, Qawwali was reintroduced into the Mughal imperial court and it quickly spread throughout South Asia. Muhammad Shah is also known to have introduced religious institutions for education such as Maktabs. During his reign, the Quran was translated for the first time in simple Persian and Urdu. Also, during his reign, the formal Turkic dress, normally worn by the high Mughal nobility since Mughals originally hailed from Samarqand, was replaced by the Sherwani.

Mohammad Shah was a patron of the performing arts, almost at the cost of administrative priorities, paving the way for the disintegration of governance. While Mughal political power did decline in his reign, the Emperor encouraged the arts, employing master artists such as Nidha Mal (active 1735–75) and Chitarman, whose vivacious paintings depict scenes of court life, such as Holi celebrations, hunting and hawking. The Mughal court of the time had musicians such as Naimat Khan, also known as Sadarang, and his nephew Firoz Khan (Adarang), whose compositions popularised the musical form of Khyal.Naimat Khan composed Khyal for his disciples and he never performed Khyal. This key component of Indian classical music evolved, ascended and received princely patronage at the court of Muhammad Shah.

Scientific developments
During the reign of Muhammad Shah, a significant scientific work known as the Zij-i Muhammad Shahi was completed by Jai Singh II of Amber between the year 1727 and 1735; it consisted of 400 pages.

Later Mughal-Maratha wars

After Asaf Jah I left Delhi, the Marathas, who had already expanded up to the river Narmada, invaded the rich province of Malwa in the beginning of 1723. The Mughal Emperor entrusted its defence to its governor, who failed him. By winter of the same year, they reached Ujjain, the capital of Malwa.
In 1725, the governorship of Gujarat was transferred to Sarbuland Khan. Enraged by the authority of the Mughal Emperor, the Marathas invaded Gujarat but were routed by Sarbuland Khan and his forces. This was mainly because most of the Maratha forces, including their leader Baji Rao I, were at the time fighting the Asaf Jah I in Hyderabad. The war with Hyderabad, however, proceeded favourably for the Marathas.

In 1728, during February, the Asaf Jah I was decisively defeated at the Battle of Palkhed.
In the year 1728, the Marathas led by Baji Rao I and his brother Chimnaji Appa invaded the Mughal province of Malwa and challenged the Mughal Subedar Girdihar Bahadur, who led a fairly large Mughal Army during the Battle of Amjhera. Both Girdihar Bahadur and his trusted cousin Daya Bahadur were defeated and killed. On 29 November, Chimnaji Appa went on to besiege the remnants of the Mughal Army of Malwa during a failed Siege of Ujjain.

In the year 1731, Asaf Jah I the Nizam of Hyderabad had managed to secure the defections of influential Maratha leaders, such as Trimbak Rao Dabhade and Sanbhoji who threatened to abandon the Marathas and join the forces with the Mughal Emperor Muhammad Shah instead. This move was considered unacceptable by Baji Rao I and his brother Chimnaji Appa who led a large well armed Forces of Marathas to intercept Trimbak Rao Dabhade and Sanbhoji during the Battle of Dabhoi, where the defecting factions were all defeated, overrun and killed. Baji Rao I then attacked Gujarat with full force and finally drove out Sarbuland Khan by 1735.

In the year 1736, Siddi's of Murud-Janjira set out to recapture Raigarh from the forces of Baji Rao, on 19 April 1736, Chimnaji attacked the gathering forces in the encampments of the Siddi's during a battle near Riwas, when the confrontation ended, 1500 Siddi's including their leader Siddi Sat were killed. Peace was concluded in September 1736, but the Siddi's were confined to Janjira, Gowalkot and Anjanvel.

In the year 1737, Asaf Jah I the Nizam of Hyderabad led a large Mughal Army to assist the Nawab of Bhopal Yar Muhammad Khan Bahadur but was instead besieged inside the city of Bhopal by 80,000 Marathas led by Baji Rao I. The Battle of Bhopal continued until Safdarjung and his relief forces were driven away by Malhar Rao Holkar. With the following peace negotiations, Asaf Jah I agreed to the peace treaty ratified by the Mughal Emperor Muhammad Shah that granted Malwa to the Marathas.
In the year 1737 the Maratha chieftain Baji Rao I attacked the Mughal imperial capital at Delhi, and defeated a well trained Mughal Army led by Amir Khan Bahadur, but was forced to withdraw when the Mughal sent substantially well armed reinforcements fought major skirmishes with the Marathas on the outskirts of Delhi. Baji Rao I and his Marathas fled southeast to Badshshpur, where he corresponded with the Mughal Emperor Muhammad Shah, who ratified peace by agreeing the handover of Malwa to the Marathas.

Among the loyal tributaries of the Mughal Empire was Meenakshi, the queen of the Madurai Nayaks in Dindigul Fort, she had assisted Mughal forces in the Carnatic several times against the Marathas.

In the year 1740, Dost Ali Khan to Nawab of the Carnatic and Chanda Sahib faced the task of expelling the Marathas under Raghoji I Bhonsle, authorised by Shahu. Dost Ali Khan lost his life on 20 May 1740 at the Battle of Damalcherry in defence of Arcot and its populace, which was eventually looted and plundered. Chanda Sahib along with his garrison was captured and imprisoned in Satara. Chanda Sahib and his forces ferociously defended their rightful reams during the Siege of Trichinopoly and almost all the territories of the Nawab of the Carnatic despite being outnumbered substantially by the Marathas, their daunting efforts soon attracted the attention of the curious French East India Company official named Joseph François Dupleix. dissatisfied by the Maratha occupation of the territories of the Nawab of the Carnatic, Asaf Jah I led an expedition to liberate the Carnatic he was joined by Sadatullah Khan II and Anwaruddin Muhammed Khan together they recaptured Arcot and initiated the Siege of Trichinopoly (1743), which lasted five months and forced the Marathas led by Murari Rao Ghorpade to evacuate the Carnatic.

In the year 1747, the Marathas led by Raghoji I Bhonsle, began to raid, pillage and annex the territories of the Nawab of Bengal Alivardi Khan. During the Maratha invasion of Orissa, its Subedar Mir Jafar completely withdrew all forces until the arrival of Alivardi Khan and the Mughal Army at the Battle of Burdwan where Raghoji I Bhonsle and his Maratha forces were completely routed. The enraged Nawab of Bengal Alivardi Khan then dismissed the shamed Mir Jafar. However, four years later Orissa was ceded over to the Marathas by the Mughal Emperor.

Invasion of Nadir Shah

On 13 February 1739 the Persians under the military genius Nader Shah, the commander of the Afsharids, had deposed the former Safavid dynasty, then defeated Persia's arch rival, the Ottoman Empire several times, and had therefore secured the western front. Now his eyes turned upon the wealthy but weakened Mughal Empire. In the year 1739, Nader Shah invaded the Mughal Empire, and defeated Muhammad Shah during the Battle of Karnal in less than three hours, and then marched upon the Mughal capital Delhi, and after a chain of events, he completely sacked and looted it, and occupied much of the northern regions of the Mughal Empire.

Tensions with Persia
Nader Shah wanted to subdue Afghan rebels led by the Ghilzai tribe particularly in the region around Kandahar. He therefore requested the assistance of the Muhammad Shah to close the frontiers around Kabul and the Indus Valley so that the rebels may not flee or seek refuge. Muhammad Shah gave a confirming reply to Nader Shah but didn't do any thing practically, because the local Subedars and Faujdars sympathised with the Afghan and rejected Persian rule. The Afghan rebels eventually did flee to the Mughals.

Outraged by this, Nader Shah sent an ambassador to Muhammad Shah, demanding deliverance of the fugitives. The Mughal Emperor did not provide a positive response and kept the Persians marginalised from Delhi for an entire year. Nader Shah became furious with Muhammad Shah. He had now found himself two reasons of why to invade the Mughal Empire; one, that the Mughals didn't deliver the Afghan rebels to him, and two, he knew that the Mughals were weak, but still extremely wealthy.

Invasion of the Mughal Empire
On the basis of the above reasons, Nader Shah decided to invade the Mughal Empire, by starting to attack from Afghanistan. In May 1738 he attacked Northern Afghanistan. In the same month, he captured Ghazni, in June he captured Kabul and in September Jalalabad also fell to him. In November he surrounded the fortress of Peshawar and razed it to the ground after the Battle of Khyber pass.

Finally in January 1739, he captured Lahore, after completely subduing the forces of the Mughal viceroy, Zakariya Khan Bahadur and his 25,000 elite Sowars, by the river Chenab the Afsharid forces soon encountered bands of Sikh rebels whom Nader Shah predicted would clearly benefit after his invasion.

Now Nader Shah had captured territory all the way up to Attock, and Muhammad Shah and his courtiers could not close their eyes from further danger. They finally understood that the Persian emperor was not the sort of enemy that could be bought off with the loot of a province. Furthermore, he had devastated the area he just conquered. The cities of Wazirabad, Emanabad and Gujrat were not only sacked but razed to the ground. Near Larkana the Afsharid forces completely routed the Mughal Army of the Nawab of Sindh, Main Noor Mohammad Kalhoro, and later captured him and his two sons.

In February 1739, Nader Shah captured Sirhind and moved towards the field of Karnal, a battle destined to be fateful to the Mughal rulers. On 13 February, the battle of Karnal was fought. Emperor Muhammad Shah had over a hundred thousand force against Nader Shah's 55,000 men but was still decisively defeated in less than three hours. In the event, the Khan Douran died and wrote a will that the Mughal and Afsharid emperors should not meet, but Nader Shah should be turned back from there at all costs. Rao Bal Kishan, with his army and with the forces of Delhi, fought Nadir Shah. His army included 5000 infantry and 2000 cavalry. Rao Bal Kishan was killed in the battle but immortalized the name "Vijay or Veergati" The Battle was ambitious as Nadir Shah itself remarked to Mughal Emperor that if your combined forces helped Rao Balkrishna of Rewari, than I might not able to enter in Delhi. I had never seen any warrior like him brave , Fierce and  strong. After this to a royal chhatri kiosk was made by Mughal Emperor to remark tribute to Rao Balkrishna. Today also the Chhatri is in Karnal. But the Mughal Emperor Muhammad Shah believed that he had no other choice but to surrender to Nader Shah on 26 February in the Afsharid encampments, thirteen days after the Battle of Karnal. The Mughal Emperor Muhammad Shah handed over the keys of the Delhi gate and marched as a captive with Nader Shah to Delhi, which was then completely plundered.

After entering Delhi, Nader Shah claimed to occupy the Mughal Empire out of religious devotion and that if "the wretched Marathas of the Deccan" moved towards Delhi, he might "send an army of victorious Qizilbash to drive them to the abyss of Hell". In fact Nader Shah had delivered catastrophe from which the Mughal Empire itself never recovered and the subjects of the emperor were outraged by the ascendancy of the Afsharids.

At first, things were cordial among the two emperors. However rumours spread throughout Delhi that Nader Shah was assassinated. The masses attacked the Persian force and killed some soldiers. Nader Shah, furious, ordered to massacre the populace, and at least 30,000 people died. The Emperor and Asaf Jah I had to beg Nader Shah for mercy and thus he stopped the massacre and turned to looting the Mughal treasury. The famous Peacock Throne, the Daria-i-Noor diamond and unimaginable wealth was looted. In addition, elephants, horses and everything that was liked was taken. Muhammad Shah also had to hand over his daughter Jahan Afruz Banu Begum as a bride for Nader Shah's youngest son. Asaf Jah I retired to Deccan after installing his eldest son Intizam-ud-Daula as a major commander in the Mughal Army.

After the whole event, Muhammad Shah was crowned as emperor by Nader Shah himself on 12 May, and he ceded the area west of river Indus to Nader Shah, although the Kalhora Nawabs of Sindh continued to fight the invading Afsharids. Nader Shah then took the Koh-i-Noor diamond and the other aforementioned famous treasures, and he and his Persian forces started to return to Persia.

Aftermath
Nader Shah's invasion destroyed what was left of the Mughal Empire and neared it to its end. After the invasion, the Mughals rapidly disintegrated. The weakness of the Mughal Army was clearly elaborated after this invasion. The Nawabs clearly could not even relieve their captured city of Delhi, which was the seat of their authority. The Mughals were completely looted of their wealth, and rebellions and disloyalty became commonplace.

Revolts against Muhammad Shah 
In 1719, Kolis of Mahi River were most rebellious against Mughal rule and plundering the villages, Mihir Ali Khan who was acting as Viceroy of Gujarat at the place of Ajit Singh of Marwar, marched against Koli rebels of Mahi who were committing piracy against muslims and subdued them.

In 1721, Kasim Ali Khan who was an officer in Mughal Empire under Muuhammad Shah employed against the Kolis of Kheda district to collect the fine but they refused to pay and there was a battle in Pethapur between Kolis and Mughal army under Kasim Ali Khan. Kasim Ali Khan was killed by Kolis and Mughal army was defeated and retreat to base.* 

In 1722, Muhammad Bahadur, son of Salabat Khan Babi, was placed in charge of Sadra and Virpur, with the title of Sher Khan. Shortly after his arrival the viceroy marched against and subdued the rebellious Kolis of the Chunval but was wounded deeply. After that Kolis of Modhera opposed the Muhammad Shah but Modhera village was burnt down.

In 1729, Mughal Viceroy of Sultan Muhammad Shah faced the challenge of anti-muslim activities of Kolis of Sorath, viceroy marches against Kolis of sorath and destroying them taken to Ahmednagar. after this, Jawan Mard Khan Babi who was Governor of Petlad ordered against rebellious Kolis of Balor, probably Bhátod about fifteen miles east of Bharuch, but Jawan Marad Khan was killed by a man of Koli tribe, and in revenge for his death the town of Balor was plundered. On the death of Jawán Mard Khan, at the request of Salabat Muhammad Khan Babi, his eldest son Kamal-ud-din Khan Babi received the districts of Sami and Munjpur and the title of Jawan Mard Khan.

In 1738, Sher Khan Babi was of Junagadh was appointed as governor of sorath, Babi was obliged to march against a Koli chieftain Kanji Chunvalia of Chhaniar in Chunval because Kanji opposed and resisted the mughal authority but Sher Khan Babi was bravely resisted by Kolis so Momin Khan was called with large force and Chhaniar was burned down by mughal army.

In 1739, Koli chieftain Jamaji of Thara, raised the Kolis of Kankrej against sultan and continually plundered the mughal territory. Jawan Marad Khan was ordered to march against the Koli chieftain but he was unable to maintain order so he requested the Fida-ud-din Khan to subdue the Kolis. After defeating the Koli chieftain, the Koli country was plundered by mughal troops.

In 1740, Kolis of Atarsumba, challenged the Mughal authority and refused to pay any form of tax to mughal sultan. Jawan marad khan along with his brother Zorawar Khan Babi Marched against Kolis of Atarsumba but they were strongly resisted and there was a battle but mughals defeated the Kolis and make them to pay tax. But it was not for long time, after some time, Kolis again refused to pay tax and mughal troops were sent under Abdul Hussain Khan and Vajeram burnt the three Koli villages.

In 1747, Rangoji a Maratha military leader returned to Áhmedábád, and Jawán Mard Khán had an interview with him a few miles from the city. Shortly after this the Kolis of Mehmudabad and Mahudha rebelled, but the revolt was speedily crushed by Sháhbáz Rohilla.

Foreign relations
Following Nader Shah's invasion, Persia's arch rival the Ottoman Empire, quickly exploited the void that was created at their Eastern borders as almost all Persian units were deployed in the Mughal Empire. During that period Mughal Emperor Muhammad Shah closely observed the actions of the Ottomans, and also cooperated with the Ottoman ambassador Haji Yusuf Agha until the emperor's death in 1748 after the victory of the Mughal Army at the Battle of Manupur (1748) against yet another foe (Ahmad Shah Durrani).

Marriages

Emperor Muhammad Shah had four wives. His first wife and chief consort was his first-cousin, Princess Badshah Begum, the daughter of Emperor Farrukhsiyar and his first wife, Gauhar-un-Nissa Begum. He married her after his accession on 8 December 1721 at Delhi, and gave her the title Malika-uz-Zamani (Queen of the Age) by which she was popularly known. On this occasion there was a great ceremony lasting for weeks. She bore him his first son, Shahriyar Shah Bahadur, who died young in 1726. She was his most influential wife and exercised her opinions on him. She died on 14 December 1789. Later, Muhammad Shah took a second wife, Sahiba Mahal. With her, he had a daughter, Hazrat Begum, who married Ahmad Shah Durrani in the year 1757.

His third wife was a dancing girl, Udham Bai, who bore him his future successor, Ahmad Shah Bahadur on 23 December 1725. Upon his birth, he was taken from her and was lovingly brought up by Badshah Begum, who considered him her own son. It was through Badshah Begum's efforts that Ahmad Shah was able to ascend the throne upon Muhammad Shah's death in 1748.

Death

The victory of the Mughal Army during the Battle of Manupur (1748) came with a heavy price as many fell in battle. Initially this was kept a secret. However, when the news reached the Mughal Emperor Muhammad Shah, he could not speak, suddenly became sick, and did not come out of his apartments for three days. During this period he fasted. His guards could hear him crying out loud and saying: "How could I bring about anyone as faithful as he? (Qamaruddin Khan)". He died due to grief on 26 April 1748, his funeral was attended by visiting Imams from Mecca. Muhammad Shah's tomb is located in an enclosure within the Nizamuddin Dargah complex.

In popular culture
 In the 2010 historical TV series Maharaja Ranjit Singh telecasted on DD National, the character of Muhammad Shah is portrayed by Rishikesh Sharma.

Gallery

See also
Battle of Karnal
Koh-i-Noor
Peacock Throne
Battles involving the Mughal Empire
Ahirwal
Rewari

References

External links 

1702 births
1748 deaths
Mughal emperors
People from Fatehpur, Uttar Pradesh
18th-century Indian writers
Timurid monarchs
Indian monarchs